Emma-Kate Croghan is an Australian director and writer born in Adelaide, South Australia on Australia Day (26 January) 1972.

She is the daughter of Kate Croghan. She has been nominated for two AFI awards - Best Original Screenplay for Love and Other Catastrophes (1996) and Bronze Horse for Strange Planet (1999).

See also
 List of female film and television directors
 List of LGBT-related films directed by women

References

External links

Living people
1972 births
Australian film directors
Australian women film directors
Australian women screenwriters
Writers from Adelaide